1975 Non-Aligned Foreign Ministers Conference was held in Lima, Peru in between 25 and 30 August. Non-Aligned countries agreed to establish Solidarity Fund for Economic and Social Development as well as the Special Fund for Financing of Buffer Stocks of Raw Materials and Primary Products Exported by Developing Countries.

The foreign ministers from the Non-Aligned Movement member countries congratulated North Vietnamese victory in Vietnam War, condemned United States of America for what they called sabotaging of Kampuchea's independence and invited for dissolution of the Southeast Asia Treaty Organization. In addition to issues related to events in Southeast Asia, the meeting also addressed the issues related to Israeli–Palestinian conflict.

The meeting introduced the formal decision to accept the Tanjug proposal from January 1975 on the establishment of the Non-Aligned News Agencies Pool. North Korea was admitted as the newest member state of the movement. In an effort to establishing a closer relations with Non-Aligned countries Australian Labor Party led Australian Government of Gough Whitlam decided for Australia to participate in the event as a guest country.

References

See also
 Foreign relations of Peru

Foreign Ministers
History of Lima
1975 conferences
1975 in politics
1975 in Peru
Diplomatic conferences in Peru